= DZOR =

Defunct radio station in Olongapo, Philippines

Olongapo; Philippines
- Broadcast area: Zambales
- Frequency: 1422 kHz

Programming
- Format: Silent

Ownership
- Owner: Zambales Broadcasting and Development Corporation

History
- Call sign meaning: Olongapo Radio

Technical information
- Licensing authority: NTC

DZOR (1422 AM) was a radio station owned and operated by Zambales Broadcasting and Development Corporation. The station's studio was located along Rizal Ave., Olongapo, Philippines near the Bajac-Bajac Bridge.
